The Diocese of Central Kondoa is a diocese in the Anglican Church of Tanzania: its current bishop is the Right Reverend Given Gaula.

Notes

Anglican bishops of Kondoa
Kondoa District